The following outline is provided as an overview of and topical guide to Albania:

Republic of Albania – sovereign country located on the Balkan Peninsula in Southern Europe. It has a coast on the Adriatic Sea to the west, and on the Ionian Sea to the southwest. Albania is a parliamentary democracy that is transforming its economy into a market-oriented system. The Albanian capital, Tirana, is home to 350,000 of the country's 3.6 million population. As a result of the opening of the country in the post-communist era, Albania is now undergoing a development boom as its telecommunications, transport and utilities infrastructure is being revamped.

General reference 

 Pronunciation:  
 Common English country name: Albania
 Official English country name: The Republic of Albania
 Common endonym(s): List of countries and capitals in native languages Shqipëria/Shqipëri, Shqipnia/Shqipni
 Official endonym(s): List of official endonyms of present-day nations and states Republika e Shqipërisë
 Adjectival(s): Albanian 
 Demonym(s): Albanian
 Etymology: Name of Albania
 International rankings of Albania
 ISO country codes:  AL, ALB, 008
 ISO region codes:  See ISO 3166-2:AL
 Internet country code top-level domain:  .al

Geography of Albania 

Geography of Albania
 Albania is: a country
 Location:
 Eastern Hemisphere
 Northern Hemisphere
 Eurasia
 Europe
 Southern Europe
 Balkans (also known as "Southeastern Europe")
 Time zone:  Central European Time (UTC+01), Central European Summer Time (UTC+02)
 Extreme points of Albania
 High:  Maja e Korabit 
 Low:  Adriatic Sea 0 m
 Land boundaries:  717 km
 282 km
 172 km
 151 km
 112 km
Coastline:  362 km
 Population of Albania: 3,600,523 people (2007 estimate) - 130th most populous country
 Area of Albania:   - 139th largest country
 Atlas of Albania

Environment of Albania 

Environment of Albania
 Climate of Albania
 Protected areas of Albania
 National parks of Albania
 Wildlife of Albania
 Fauna of Albania
 Birds of Albania
 Mammals of Albania

Natural geographic features of Albania 
 Glaciers of Albania
 Islands of Albania
 Lakes of Albania
 Mountains of Albania
 Rivers of Albania
 World Heritage Sites in Albania

Regions of Albania 

Regions of Albania

Ecoregions of Albania 

List of ecoregions in Albania
 Ecoregions in Albania

Administrative divisions of Albania 

Administrative divisions of Albania
 Counties of Albania
 Municipalities of Albania

Counties of Albania 

Albania is divided into twelve counties (sing. qark (official term); but often prefektura, sing. prefekturë, sometimes translated as prefecture). Each contains several municipalities:

Municipalities of Albania 

Municipalities of Albania
Since the 2015 local administration reform, there are 61 municipalities in Albania.

Government and politics of Albania 

Politics of Albania
 Form of government: parliamentary representative democratic republic
 Capital of Albania: Tirana
 Elections in Albania
 Political parties in Albania
 Political scandals of Albania
 Taxation in Albania

Branches of the government of Albania 

Government of Albania

Executive branch of the government of Albania 
 Head of state: President of Albania
 Head of government: Prime Minister of Albania
 List of prime ministers of Albania
 Council of Ministers of Albania

Legislative branch of the government of Albania 

 Parliament of Albania: Assembly of the Republic of Albania (unicameral)

Judicial branch of the government of Albania 

Judicial system of Albania
 Constitutional Court of Albania
 Supreme Court of Albania
Administrative Courts in Albania
 Appeals courts of Albania
 District courts in Albania

Foreign relations of Albania 

Foreign relations of Albania
 Albanian passport
 Diplomatic missions in Albania
 Diplomatic missions of Albania
 Albania–Kosovo relations
 Albanian-Greek relations

International organization membership 
The Republic of Albania is a member of:

Black Sea Economic Cooperation Zone (BSEC)
Central European Initiative (CEI)
Council of Europe (CE)
Euro-Atlantic Partnership Council (EAPC)
European Bank for Reconstruction and Development (EBRD)
Food and Agriculture Organization (FAO)
International Atomic Energy Agency (IAEA)
International Bank for Reconstruction and Development (IBRD)
International Civil Aviation Organization (ICAO)
International Criminal Court (ICCt)
International Criminal Police Organization (Interpol)
International Development Association (IDA)
International Federation of Red Cross and Red Crescent Societies (IFRCS)
International Finance Corporation (IFC)
International Fund for Agricultural Development (IFAD)
International Labour Organization (ILO)
International Maritime Organization (IMO)
International Monetary Fund (IMF)
International Olympic Committee (IOC)
International Organization for Migration (IOM)
International Organization for Standardization (ISO) (correspondent)
International Red Cross and Red Crescent Movement (ICRM)
International Telecommunication Union (ITU)
International Trade Union Confederation (ITUC)
Inter-Parliamentary Union (IPU)
Islamic Development Bank (IDB)
Multilateral Investment Guarantee Agency (MIGA)
North Atlantic Treaty Organization (NATO)
Organisation internationale de la Francophonie (OIF)
Organisation of Islamic Cooperation (OIC)
Organization for Security and Cooperation in Europe (OSCE)
Organisation for the Prohibition of Chemical Weapons (OPCW)
Southeast European Cooperative Initiative (SECI)
United Nations (UN)
United Nations Conference on Trade and Development (UNCTAD)
United Nations Educational, Scientific, and Cultural Organization (UNESCO)
United Nations Industrial Development Organization (UNIDO)
United Nations Observer Mission in Georgia (UNOMIG)
Universal Postal Union (UPU)
World Customs Organization (WCO)
World Federation of Trade Unions (WFTU)
World Health Organization (WHO)
World Intellectual Property Organization (WIPO)
World Meteorological Organization (WMO)
World Tourism Organization (UNWTO)
World Trade Organization (WTO)

Law and order in Albania 

Law of Albania
 Capital punishment in Albania
 Constitution of Albania
 Crime in Albania
 Albanian mafia
 Human rights in Albania
 LGBT rights in Albania
 Freedom of religion in Albania
 Law enforcement in Albania
 Albanian Police

Military of Albania 

Military of Albania
 Command
 Commander-in-chief:
 Ministry of Defence of Albania
 Albanian Joint Forces Command
 Rapid Reaction Brigade
 Commando Regiment
 Albanian Air Brigade
 Albanian Navy Brigade
 Area Support Brigade
 Albanian Support Command
 Forces
 Army of Albania
 Navy of Albania
 Air Force of Albania
 Special forces of Albania
 Weapons of mass destruction in Albania - None
 Military history of Albania
 Military ranks of Albania

Local government in Albania 

Local government in Albania

History of Albania

By period 
 Origin of the Albanians
 Prehistory
 Prehistoric Balkans
 Illyria and Illyrians
 Ancient Albania
 Illyricum (Roman province) (229 B.C.)
 Albania in the Middle Ages (4th - 12th century)
 Barbarian invasions of Albania and the Early Middle Ages
 Albania in the Early Middle Ages
 Albania in the Late Middle Ages
 Ottoman era
 History of Ottoman Albania (1385 - 1912)
 Albania Veneta
 Albanian nationalism and independence (1912)
 History of Albania (1919–1939) (World War I, and the Great Depression era)
 Principality of Albania (1914–1925)
 Albanian Republic (1925–1928)
 Kingdom of Albania (1928–39) (1928–1939)
 Military history of Albania during World War II
 Italian invasion of Albania (1939)
 Albania under Italy (1939–1943)
 Albania under Nazi Germany (1943–1944)
 Albanian Resistance of World War II
 History of Communist Albania (1944–1992)
 Socialist People's Republic of Albania (1944–1992)
 History of post-Communist Albania (since 1992)
 Accession of Albania to the European Union

By field 
 Albanian sworn virgins
 Military history of Albania
 Albania and weapons of mass destruction

Culture of Albania 

Culture of Albania
 Architecture of Albania
 Cuisine of Albania
 Languages of Albania
 Albanian language
 Media in Albania
 National symbols of Albania
 Coat of arms of Albania
 Flag of Albania
 National anthem of Albania
 People of Albania
 Prostitution in Albania
 Public holidays in Albania
 Religion in Albania
 Christianity in Albania
 Islam in Albania
 Judaism in Albania
 World Heritage Sites in Albania

Art in Albania 
 Art in Albania
 Cinema of Albania
 Literature of Albania
 Music of Albania
 Television in Albania
 Theatre in Albania

Sports in Albania 

Sports in Albania
 Albania at the Olympics
 Football in Albania
 Albanian Football Association
 Albania national football team
 Albania national under-21 football team
 Albanian Superliga

Economy and infrastructure of Albania 

Economy of Albania
 Economic rank, by nominal GDP (2007):  112th (one-hundred twelfth)
 Agriculture in Albania
 Banking in Albania
 National Bank of Albania
 Banks in Albania
 Communications in Albania
 Internet in Albania
 News in Albania
 Companies of Albania
 Currency of Albania: Lek
ISO 4217: ALL
 Energy in Albania
 Energy in Albania
 Energy policy of Albania
 Oil industry in Albania
 Health care in Albania
 Mining in Albania
 Tirana Stock Exchange
 Tourism in Albania
 Visa policy of Albania
 Transport in Albania
 Airports in Albania
 Rail transport in Albania
 Vehicular transport
 Roads in Albania
 Vehicle registration plates of Albania

Education in Albania 

Education in Albania
 Academic grading in Albania
 Schools in Albania
 Universities in Albania

See also 

Albania

List of international rankings
Member state of the North Atlantic Treaty Organization
Member state of the United Nations

References

External links

 Government
 Presidency of Albania
 The Albanian Parliament

 Country Data
 Albanian Institute of Statistics
 Albania. The World Factbook. Central Intelligence Agency.

 Other
  National Tourism Organization Albania's official website for travel & tourism information.
 Tourism, Krujë
 
 VIVAlbania, hospitality and ecotourism in Albania
 Treasure of the national library of Albania

 
 
Albania